Carfagna is a surname. Notable people with the surname include:

Carlo Carfagna (born 1940), Italian classical guitarist
Mara Carfagna (born 1975), Italian politician and former showgirl and model
Rick Carfagna, American politician

Italian-language surnames